The following is a list of Scout Laws in national Scout and Guide organizations.

Africa Scout Region

South Africa 

 A Scout's honour is to be trusted
 A Scout is loyal
 A Scout's duty is to be useful and to help others.
 A Scout is a friend to all and a brother / sister to every other Scout
 A Scout is courteous
 A Scout is a friend to animals
 A Scout obeys orders
 A Scout smiles and whistles under all difficulties
 A Scout is thrifty
 A Scout is clean in thought, word and deed

Arab Scout Region

Egypt

Egyptian Federation for Scouts and Girl Guides

 A Scout’s honour is to be trusted.
 A Scout is loyal.
 A Scout’s duty is to be useful and to help others.
 A Scout is a friend to all and a brother to every other Scout.
 A Scout is courteous.
 A Scout is a friend to animals.
 A Scout obeys orders of his parents, Patrol Leader or Scoutmaster without question.
 A Scout smiles and whistles under all difficulties.
 A Scout is thrifty.
 A Scout is clean in thought, word and deed

Asia-Pacific Region

Australia

Scouts Australia 

 Be RespectfulBe friendly and considerateCare for others and the environment
 Do What Is RightBe trustworthy, honest and fairUse resources wisely
 Believe In MyselfLearn from my experiencesFace challenges with courage

Girl Guides Australia 

As a Guide I will strive to:
 Respect myself and others
 Be considerate, honest and trustworthy
 Be friendly to others
 Make choices for a better world
 Use my time and abilities wisely
 Be thoughtful and optimistic
 Live with courage and strength

Bangladesh

Bangladesh Scouts

Hong Kong  

 A Scout is to be trusted.
 A Scout is loyal.
 A Scout is friendly and considerate.
 A Scout belongs to the world-wide family of Scouts.
 A Scout has courage in all difficulties.
 A Scout makes good use of time and is careful of possessions and property.
 A Scout has self-respect and respect for others.

India 

 A Scout/Guide is trustworthy
 A Scout/Guide is loyal
 A Scout/Guide is a friend to all and a brother/sister to every other Scout/Guide.
 A Scout/Guide is courteous
 A Scout/Guide is a friend to animals and loves nature.
 A Scout/Guide is disciplined and helps protect public property.
 A Scout/Guide is courageous.
 A Scout/Guide is thrifty.
 A Scout/Guide is pure in thought, word and deed.

Indonesia 

 Believe in God the Almighty
 Preserve nature and love each other
 Be an affable and knightly patriot
 Be obedient and collegial
 Help others with compliance and resilience
 Be diligent, skilled and cheerful
 Be provident and simple
 Exercise discipline, be brave and faithful
 Be accountable and trustworthy
 Have purity in mind, word and act

Japan

Scout Association of Japan

Girl Scouts of Japan

Malaysia

Persekutuan Pengakap Malaysia

Persatuan Pandu Puteri Malaysia

New Zealand

New Zealand 

 "Have Respect" - For yourself and others – For the environment
 "Do What Is Right" - Be Trustworthy and Tolerant – Have integrity
 "Be Positive" - Accept challenges with courage – Be a friend to all

The New Zealand Scout Law changed in 2015 with approval from WOSM.

Philippines

Boy Scouts of the Philippines 

The BSP's initial Scout Law was exactly identical to that of the USA's and was adopted in 1923. This version remained unchanged until 1976 when the BSP was restructured as the KSP under the Marcos administration.  After the removal of Pres. Marcos in 1986, the BSP's Scout Law was restored in its original form:

Kapatirang Scout ng Pilipinas 

This was the Scout Law of Service Scouts and Community Scouts in the KSP, 1976–1986.

Girl Scouts of the Philippines 

The Girl Scout Law

Singapore

The Singapore Scout Association 

 A Scout is to be trusted
 A Scout is loyal
 A Scout makes friends, establishes and maintains harmonious relations
 A Scout is disciplined and considerate
 A Scout has courage in all difficulties.

 A Guide is polite, considerate and respects her elders
 A Guide is friendly and a sister to all Guides
 A Guide is kind to all living things
 A Guide is obedient
 A Guide has courage and is cheerful in all difficulties
 A Guide takes care of her own possessions and those of other people
 A Guide is thrifty and diligent
 A Guide is self-disciplined in what she thinks, says and does

Sri Lanka

Sri Lanka Scout Association 

 Scout is trustworthy
 Scout is loyal
 Scout is friendly and considerate
 Scout is brother to every other Scout
 Scout is courageous
 Scout is kind to animals
 Scout is cooperative
 Scout is cheerful
 Scout is thrifty
 Scout is clean in thought, word and deed

Taiwan

Scouts of China

Thailand

Thai Scout Organization

In the Name of Honor, I Promise.
One, I will Be respectful to nation, religion and the monarch.
Two, I will always to be helpful to others.
Three, I will obey the rules of the Boy Scouts.

European Scout Region
Austria (Österreich)

Pfadfinder und Pfadfinderinnen Österreichs (PPÖ)

Der Pfadfinder…

1.      … sucht den Weg zu Gott. (Spirituelles Leben)

2.      … ist treu und hilft wo er kann. (Verantwortungsbewusstes Leben in der Gemeinschaft)

3.      … achtet alle Menschen und versucht sie zu verstehen. (Weltweite Verbundenheit)

4.      … überlegt, entscheidet und handelt danach. (Kritische Auseinandersetzung mit sich selbst und der Umwelt)

5.      … führt ein einfaches Leben und schützt die Natur. (Einfaches Naturverbundenes Leben)

6.      … ist fröhlich und unverzagt. (Bereitschaft zum Abenteuer des Lebens)

7.      … nützt seine Fähigkeiten. (Schöpferisches Tun)

8.      … führt ein gesundes Leben. (Körperbewusstes und gesundes Leben)

Croatia

Savez izviđača Hrvatske

Czech Republic

Denmark

Baden-Powell Scouts' Association

KFUM-Spejderne i Danmark

DDS – Det Danske Spejderkorps

Finland

The Guides and Scouts of Finland 

The Ideals of a Scout are
 To respect others
 To love and protect the environment
 To be reliable
 To build friendship across boundaries
 To feel one’s responsibility and to take action
 To develop oneself as a human being
 To search for truth in life

Germany

Deutsche Pfadfinderschaft Sankt Georg

Pfadfinderbund Weltenbummler

Hungary

Magyar Cserkészszövetség 

 A Scout is upright and always tells the truth.
 A Scout does his/her duties to God, his/her Country and his/her fellow people.
 A Scout helps whenever he/she can.
 A Scout is a brother/sister to all Scouts.
 A Scout is gentle with others, but strict to him/herself.
 A Scout loves nature, is kind to animals and takes care of plants.
 A Scout obeys his superiors willingly and wholeheartedly
 A Scout is cheerful and considerate.
 A Scout is thrifty.
 A Scout is clean in body and soul

Iceland 

 A Scout is helpful
 A Scout is cheerful
 A Scout is loyal
 A Scout is a friend of the nature
 A Scout is considerate
 A Scout is modest
 A Scout is cooperative
 A Scout is thrifty
 A Scout is respectful
 A Scout is independent

Ireland

Gasóga na hÉireann 

 A Scout is to be trusted.
 A Scout is loyal.
 A Scout is helpful and considerate to all.
 A Scout has courage in all difficulties.
 A Scout makes good use of time and is careful of possessions and property.
 A Scout has respect for self and others.
 A Scout respects nature and the environment

Scouting Ireland (CSI) 

 A Scout is loyal
 A Scout is trustworthy
 A Scout is helpful
 A Scout is friendly
 A Scout is courteous
 A Scout is kind
 A Scout is obedient
 A Scout is cheerful
 A Scout is thrifty
 A Scout is brave
 A Scout is pure in thought, word and deed
 A Scout does all for the glory of God

Israel

Hebrew Scouts Movement in Israel 

 A Scout speaks the truth
 A Scout is loyal to his people and his country and language
 A Scout is useful member in society, loves work and helping others
 A Scout is a friend of every person and brother of every Scout
 A Scout is polite
 A Scout loves plant and animal life and protects it
 A Scout is a disciplined man
 A Scout's spirit does not fall
 A Scout is a frugal person
 A Scout is clean in words and deeds

Italy

Scouting for Boys

Latvia

Netherlands

Traditional groups 
 A Scout is honest.
 A Scout is loyal.
 A Scout is helpful.
 A Scout is brother for other Scouts.
 A Scout is kind and sportive.
 A Scout has care for nature.
 A Scout knows how to obey.
 A Scout continues.
 A Scout is thrifty.
 A Scout has respect for himself and all others.

Malta

The Scout Association of Malta 

 A Scout is to be trusted.
 A Scout is loyal.
 A Scout is friendly and considerate.
 A Scout is a brother to all Scouts.
 A Scout has courage in all difficulties.
 A Scout makes good use of his time and is careful of possessions and property.
 A Scout has respect for himself and for others.
 A Scout is clean in thought, word and deed.

Norway

Norwegian Guide and Scout Association 
 A Scout seeks his faith and respect others beliefs;
 A Scout accepts responsibility for him/herself and others;
 A Scout is helpful and considerate;
 A Scout is a good friend;
 A Scout is honest and trustworthy;
 A Scout knows the nature and protects it;
 A Scout thinks and acts independently, and tries to understand other people;
 A Scout does his/her best in difficulties and troubles;
 A Scout is thrifty;
 A Scout works for peace and understanding between people.

YWCA-YMCA Guides and Scouts of Norway 
 A Scout is open to God;
 A Scout is a good friend;
 A Scout know and care for the nature;
 A Scout is trustworthy;
 A Scout is thrifty;
 A Scout works for peace;
 A Scout takes responsibility and shows the way;

Poland

Związek Harcerstwa Polskiego

Scouting Association of the Republic

Portugal

Associação dos Escoteiros de Portugal

Corpo Nacional de Escutas

Slovenia

Slovenian Catholic Girl Guides and Boy Scouts Association 

 A Scout's honor is to be trusted.
 A Scout is loyal to God and homeland.
 A Scout helps others and does at least one good turn every day.
 A Scout is a friend to all and sister/brother to every other Scout.
 A Scout is courteous.
 A Scout respects nature and seeing in it the work of God.
 A Scout obeys her/his parents and superiors and conscientiously performs her/his duties.
 A Scout whistles and sings in difficulties.
 A Scout is hard-working and thrifty.
 A Scout is clean in thought, word and deed.

Scout Association of Slovenia 

 A Scout is trustworthy
 A Scout is loyal
 A Scout is friendly
 A Scout is prepared to help
 A Scout is disciplinized
 A Scout is cheerful
 A Scout is courageous
 A Scout is noble
 A Scout is respectful
 A Scout is eager for knowledge
 A Scout is thrifty
 A Scout lives healthy

Spain 

{| class="wikitable"
|-
! English
! Spanish
|-
|
 A scout's honour is to be trusted .
 A scout is loyal.
 A scout is useful and helpful.
 El scout es amigo de todos y hermano de cualquier otro scout.A scout is a friend to all and a brother to every other scout.
 A scout is courteous and chivalrous.
 A scout cares and respects nature.
 A scout doesn't leave things half-done.
 A scout smiles and sings under all difficulties.
 A Scout is hard-working, and respectful of others' well being. (The Spanish phrase respetuoso del bien ajeno can also be translated as "respectful of others' goods and properties".)
 A scout is clean and pure in thought, word and deed.
|
 El scout cifra su honor en ser digno de confianza. 
 El scout es leal. 
 El scout es útil y servicial. 
 El scout es amigo de todos y hermano de cualquier otro scout. 
 El scout es cortés y caballeroso. 
 El scout cuida y respeta la naturaleza. 
 El scout no deja nada a medias. 
 El scout sonrie y canta ante las dificultades.
 El scout es trabajador y respeta el bien ajeno. 
 El scout es limpio y puro en pensamientos, palabras y acciones. 
|}

 Sweden 

  Switzerland 

Guides and Scouts, we wish:
 To be honest and sincere
 To listen to and respect others
 To rejoice in all that is beautiful and give joy to others
 To be thoughtful and helpful
 To share
 To choose to the best of our abilities and to commit ourselves
 To protect nature and respect life
 To face difficulties with confidence

 Ukraine 

The Plast Scout Law is as follows:
 A Scout keeps his (her) word.
 A Scout is thorough.
 A Scout is punctual.
 A Scout is thrifty.
 A Scout is just.
 A Scout is courteous.
 A Scout is brotherly and friendly.
 A Scout is levelheaded.
 A Scout is useful.
 A Scout obeys Plast leadership.
 A Scout is diligent.
 A Scout cares for his (her) health.
 A Scout loves beauty and cares for it.
 A Scout is always optimistic.

 United Kingdom 

 Baden-Powell Scouts' Association 

 A Scouts' honour is to be trusted.
 A Scout is loyal to The Queen, His Country, His Scouters, His Parents, His Employers and to those under Him.
 A Scouts' duty is to be useful and help others.
 A Scout is a friend to all, and a brother to every other Scout, no matter to what Country, Class or Creed the other may belong.
 A Scout is courteous.
 A Scout is a friend to animals.
 A Scout obeys orders of his parents, Patrol Leader, or Scout Master without question.
 A Scout smiles and whistles under all difficulties.
 A Scout is thrifty.
 A Scout is clean in thought, word and deed.

 British Boy Scouts and British Girl Scouts Association 

 A Scout is honourable, truthful and reliable.
 A Scout is loyal to the Queen, his/her Country, his/her Parents, his/her Officers and to comrades high and low.
 A Scout is helpful to others, whatever it may cost him/her.
 A Scout is a friend to all and a brother/sister to all Scouts.
 A Scout is courteous to all.
 A Scout is kind to animals.
 A Scout is obedient and follows orders from his/her Parents and Officers promptly.
 A Scout is cheerful and takes trouble with a trusting grace.
 A Scout is self-reliant and a good steward of his/her possessions.
 A Scout is upright in his/her conduct.

 European Scout Federation

 A Scout's honour is to be trusted.
 A Scout is loyal to the Queen, his Country, her Scouters, her parents, her employers and to those under him.
 A Scout's duty is to be useful and help others.
 A Scout is a friend to all, and a brother to every other Scout, no matter to what country, class or creed the other belongs.
 A Scout is courteous.
 A Scout is a friend to animals and all created things.
 A Scout obeys orders of his parents, Patrol Leader, or Scoutmaster without question.
 A Scout smiles and whistles under all difficulties.
 A Scout is thrifty.
 A Scout is clean in thought, word and deed.

 Girlguiding UK 

 A Guide is honest, reliable and can be trusted.
 A Guide is helpful and uses her time and abilities wisely.
 A Guide faces challenge and learns from her experiences.
 A Guide is a good friend and a sister to all Guides.
 A Guide is polite and considerate.
 A Guide respects all living things and takes care of the world around her.

 The Scout Association

 A Scout is to be trusted.
 A Scout is loyal.
 A Scout is friendly and considerate.
 A Scout belongs to the worldwide family of Scouts.
 A Scout has courage in all difficulties.
 A Scout makes good use of time and is careful of possessions and property.
 A Scout has self-respect and respect for others.

Interamerican Scout Region

 Argentina 

 Scouts de Argentina 

 A Scout loves God and lives his/her faith fully.
 A Scout is loyal and worthy of all trust.
 A Scout is generous, courteous, and shows solidarity.
 A Scout is respectful and brother/sister of everyone.
 A Scout defends and values the family.
 A Scout loves and defends life and nature.
 A Scout knows how to obey; he/she chooses and acts with responsibility.
 A Scout is optimistic even through difficult times.
 A Scout is economic, hard-working, and respectful of others' well being. (The Spanish phrase respetuoso del bien ajeno can also be translated as "respectful of others' goods and properties".)
 A Scout is pure and leads a healthy life.

Baden Powell Scouts Argentina 

The Scout:
 He bases his honor to be worthy of confidence.
 He's loyal.
 It is useful and helps others without expecting anything in return
 It is everyone's friend, and brother to all Scouts, regardless of creed, race or social class.
 It is polite and gentlemanly.
 Obey without mirrors and nothing by halves.
 Sees in nature the work of God protects animals and plants.
 He smiles and sings in the difficulties
 It's affordable, hardworking and thorough the good of others.
 A Scout is clean and healthy, pure thoughts, words and actions.

Diocesan Association of Catholic Scouts 

 A Scout is trustworthy because he is responsible.
 A Scout is loyal.
 The Scout serves and helping others without expecting reward.
 A Scout is friend to all and brother to other Scouts.
 A Scout is courteous.
 The Scout sees in nature the work of God and that's good with animals and plants.
 A Scout obeys without mirrors and does nothing by halves.
 A Scout smiles and sings in difficult times.
 The Scout is thrifty and respects the property of others.
 A Scout is clean in thought, word and deed and use all their senses.

Brazil

Federação de Bandeirantes do Brasil 
A Guide:
 is trustworthy.
 is loyal and respects truth.
 helps others on all occasion.
 esteems and cherishes friendship.
 is kind and courteous.
 sees God in creation and protects nature.
 knows how to obey.
 faces all difficulties cheerfully.
 uses resources wisely.
 acts, thinks, and is coherent with moral values.

União dos Escoteiros do Brasil

Canada

Scouts Canada

A Scout is
Helpful and trustworthy,
Kind and cheerful,
Considerate and clean,
And wise in the use of all resources.

Girl Guides of Canada 

The Guiding Law challenges me to:
 Be honest and trustworthy
 Use my resources wisely
 Respect myself and others
 Recognize and use my talents and abilities
 Protect our common environment
 Live with courage and strength
 Share in the sisterhood of Guiding

Baden-Powell Service Association

 A Scout's honour is to be trusted 
 A Scout is Loyal to the Queen, and to his country, and to his employers.
 A Scout's duty is to be useful and to help others.
 A Scout is a friend to all and a brother to every other Scout.
 A Scout is Courteous.
 A Scout is a friend to animals.
 A Scout obeys orders of his patrol leader or Scout master without question.
 A Scout smiles and whistles under all difficulties.
 A Scout is thrifty.
 A Scout is clean in thought, word and deed.

Chile 

 The Scout places his honor in being worthy of trust.
 The Scout is loyal.
 The Scout is useful and helps others, without thinking of compensation.
 The Scout shares with everyone.
 The Scout is courteous and gentlemanly.
 The Scout cares for nature and finds God in it
 The Scout is obedient and does nothing half way.
 The Scout is optimistic.
 The Scout is thrifty.
 The Scout is clean and pure in thought, word and deed.

Colombia

Costa Rica

Asociación de Guías y Scouts de Costa Rica 

 A Scout shows his honour by being worthy of trust.
 A Scout is loyal to God, his nation, his parents, his bosses, and his subordinates.
 A Scout is useful and helps others without thinking of rewards.
 A Scout is everybody's friend and brother/sister of all Scouts, without distinction of creed, race, nationality, or social class.
 A Scout is courteous and well mannered.
 A Scout sees God's work in nature. He or she protects animals and plants.
 A Scout obeys rationally and does things in an orderly and complete manner.
 A Scout smiles and sings through difficult times.
 A Scout is economic, hard-working, and careful of others' well being. (The original Spanish phrase, cuidadoso del bien ajeno, can also mean "being careful/respectful of others' properties".)
 A Scout is clean and healthy; pure in his thoughts, words, and actions.

Guatemala

Asociación de Scouts de Guatemala

Trinidad and Tobago

A scout:
is to be trusted
is loyal
is friendly and considerate
is a brother to all scouts
has courage in all difficulties
makes good use of his time and is careful with possessions and property
has respect for himself and others

United States

Boy Scouts of America 

The BSA's initial Scout Law was virtually identical to that of Britain's and was first adopted on July 9, 1910. This version steadily changed until August 1, 1911 when the BSA's Scout Law took its current form.

A Scout is:
 trustworthy,
 loyal,
 helpful,
 friendly,
 courteous,
 kind,
 obedient,
 cheerful,
 thrifty,
 brave,
 clean, and
 reverent.

Girl Scouts of the USA 

I will do my best to be
honest and fair,
friendly and helpful,
considerate and caring,
courageous and strong, and
responsible for what I say and do,
and to
respect myself and others,
respect authority,
use resources wisely,
make the world a better place, and
be a sister to every Girl Scout.

Baden-Powell Scouts' Association 

A Scout's honor is to be trusted.
A Scout is loyal to country, Scouters, parents, employers, and to those under them.
A Scout's duty is to be useful and to help others.
A Scout is a friend to all, and a brother to every other Scout, no matter to what country, class, or creed, the other may belong.
A Scout is courteous.
A Scout is a friend to animals.
A Scout obeys the orders of parents, Patrol Leader, or Scout Leader, without question.
A Scout smiles and whistles under all difficulties.
A Scout is thrifty.
A Scout is clean in thought, word, and deed.

References

External links

Scouting ideals